The 1961 Segunda División de Chile was the 10th season of the Segunda División de Chile.

Unión La Calera was the tournament's champion.

Table

See also
Chilean football league system

References

External links
 RSSSF 1961

Segunda División de Chile (1952–1995) seasons
Primera B
Chil